Drogoszewo may refer to the following places:
Drogoszewo, Greater Poland Voivodeship (west-central Poland)
Drogoszewo, Masovian Voivodeship (east-central Poland)
Drogoszewo, Podlaskie Voivodeship (north-east Poland)